Paul Lacombe (born 12 June 1990) is a French professional basketball player for SIG Strasbourg of the French LNB Pro A.

Professional career
Lacome won the French League championship in 2009. He won the French League Cup in 2010, 2015, and 2018. He won also won the French Federation Cup in 2015.

In 2017, he was named the French League's Most Improved Player.

On 31 October 2022 he signed with SIG Strasbourg of the French LNB Pro A for a second stint.

National team career
Lacombe was a member of the French Under-18, Under-19, and Under-20 junior national teams. While playing with the senior French national team, Lacombe won the bronze medal at the 2019 FIBA World Cup.

References

External links
Euroleague.net Profile
FIBA Profile
FIBA Europe Profile
ProBallers.com Profile
French League Profile 
Eurobasket.com Profile

1990 births
Living people
AS Monaco Basket players
ASVEL Basket players
French men's basketball players
People from Vénissieux
Shooting guards
SIG Basket players
Small forwards
Sportspeople from Lyon Metropolis